Sant Martí, is a district of Barcelona located on its eastern side, usually numbered 10 out of the ten districts of the city.

It borders the Mediterranean Sea, Sant Adrià del Besòs and four other districts of the city: Ciutat Vella, l'Eixample, Horta-Guinardó and Sant Andreu.

It did not become an integral part of Barcelona until as late as 1897, having been an autonomous village since 1714 with the imposition of the infamous Nueva Planta decrees. Before then, it had been a secondary parish of Santa Maria del Mar.

Demographics

Sant Martí has a population of 221,029 (2005), which makes it the second most populated district in Barcelona. Being the fourth largest district (10,8 km2), it is also the sixth in density (20.466 inhabitants/km2).

Neighbourhoods

The district is divided into the following neighbourhoods:

 El Besòs i el Maresme
 El Camp de l'Arpa del Clot
 El Clot
 Diagonal Mar i Front Marítim del Poblenou
 El Parc i Llacuna del Poblenou
 El Poblenou
 Provençals del Poblenou
 Sant Martí de Provençals
 La Verneda i la Pau
 La Vila Olímpica del Poblenou

Etymology
It is possible to trace the origin of the name Provençals in the Latin word provincialis, a term used by the Romans to design fields just beyond the city walls. Also, Sant Martí is the name of the first church built in the area.

See also 

 Street names in Barcelona
 Urban planning of Barcelona

External links

 Sant Martí council
 Sant Martí neighbourhoods

 
Districts of Barcelona
1714 establishments in Spain